The  Odisha High Court is the High Court for the Indian state of Odisha.

The then Bengal Presidency was a vast province including present day Assam, Bihar, Jharkhand, Orissa, and West Bengal. It was difficult to administratively manage such a vast area, inhabited by people speaking in different languages and having different traditions. Administrative exigencies required separation of such areas which originally did not from part of Bengal. So, new province of Bihar and Orissa was formed on 22 March 1912. However, the said new province of Bihar and Bihar and Orissa was under the jurisdiction of Calcutta High Court.

On 9 February 1916, in exercise of the powers under Section 113 of the Government of India Act, 1915, the King of England issued letters of patent constituting High Court of Patna. Orissa was placed under the jurisdiction of Patna High Court. Although, on 18 May 1916, Circuit Court of Patna High Court for Orissa held its first sitting at Cuttack.

On 1 April 1936, Orissa was made a separate province but no separate High Court was provided for it. The Government of India agreed to create a new High Court, and for that purpose the Government of India issued the Orissa High Court Order, 1948, under the Section 229(1) of the Government of India Act, 1935, on 30 April 1948. Finally, on 26 July 1948, Orissa High Court was formally inaugurated.

The seat of the court is Cuttack. The court has a sanctioned judge strength of 27.

List of Sitting Judges in Odisha High Court (Seniority Wise)
As on 1st January 2023, 5 positions are vacant.

List of Chief Justices of Odisha High Court

Judges who served as Chief Justices of the Supreme Court of India
 Hon'ble Mr. Justice Ranganath Misra (as 21st Chief Justice of India from 25 September 1990 - 24 November 1991)
 Hon'ble Mr. Justice G.B. Pattanaik (as 32nd Chief Justice of India from 08 November 2002 - 18 December 2002)
 Hon'ble Mr. Justice Dipak Misra (as 45th Chief Justice of India from 28 August 2017 - 02 October 2018)

References

External links
 Jurisdiction and Seats of Indian High Courts
 Judge strength in High Courts increased
 Orissa High Court website
 http://indianexpress.com/article/india/india-others/from-list-of-6-sc-collegium-picks-orissa-chief-justice-for-elevation/

Government of Odisha
1948 establishments in India
Courts and tribunals established in 1948